Robert George Barker (born 23 October 1944) is a former rugby union wing who played 320 times for Leicester Tigers between 1968 and 1979.  In 1977 he became only the third Leicester player to score 150 tries for the club, and is still joint third in the clubs list of all time try scorers.

Barker made his Leicester debut against Northampton Saints on 19 October 1968, despite scoring a try Barker was not used again until March when he became more of a regular featuring in 14 of the last 17 matches that season.  Originally a centre Barker switched to his more common position on the wing during the 1969-70 season, during which he became the club's regular goal kicker and was the season's top scorer with 145 points.  In 1971-72 Barker would be the club's top try scorer with 26 in 30 games, a feat he repeated in 1972-73, 73-74, 75-76 and 77-78.  On 11 September 1973 Barker scored the winning try as Leicester beat the touring  national team 22-17 at Welford Road, and in 1978 he was part of the Leicester side that reached the 1978 John Player Cup Final, only to lose 6-3 to Gloucester. Barker's late run proving the closest Leicester were to get to the Gloucester try line.  He played for a further two season but featured in only 10 more games for the club.

Sources

References

1944 births
Living people
English rugby union players
Leicester Tigers players
Rugby union players from Leicester
Rugby union wings